Asad Gulov, also known as Asad Gulzodai Bukhoroyi or Asad Gulzoda is a Tajik poet, linguist and journalist.

Life
Asad Gulzoda was born in 1935 in the village of Shavgon of Peshku District, Bukhara Region, Uzbekistan. He received his secondary education at the same place. In 1958, he graduated from the Tajik Language and Literature Department, University of Dushanbe. His next work and activity is related with teaching and journalism in the State Broadcasting Company of Bukhara region.

Asad Gulzoda went into poetry during his adolescence. His poems were published in the newspapers of Uzbekistan and Tajikistan.

Poems of Asad Gulzoda were published in the books "Murghobi chi mekobad?", "Labzi Shirin" in "Maorif" publishing house of Dushanbe. And also his poems are found in the collections "Kahkashoni orzu" (Tashkent) and "Guli murod" (Dushanbe).

In the books "Nasimi Bukhoro" (Bukhara, 2001), "Khati peshona" (Dushanbe, "Surushan", 2003) some of the best poems of the poet are collected, written in the bright periods of his life.

In 2004 "Maorif va farhang" publishing house of Dushanbe published the collection of poems under the name of "Shukifahoyi Bukhoro" and in 2007 the collections "Namozi ro'i barg" and "Nafasi bahor".

Poems of Asad Gulzoda describe Bukhara and its unique landscapes, life and labor of the population of this ancient city. Most of his poems are dedicated to children.

Asad Gulzoda has been the member of Writers' Union of Tajikistan since 2003.

References 

Persian-language poets
Tajik poets
People from Bukhara Region
1935 births
Living people